Buena Vista University is a private university in Storm Lake, Iowa. Founded in 1891 as Buena Vista College, it is affiliated with the Presbyterian Church. The university's  campus is situated on the shores of Storm Lake, a  natural lake.

At its inception, the college was housed in the Storm Lake Opera House, where it remained for only a year. Old Main, the college's first building, opened in 1892, and was occupied by faculty and students until it burned down in 1956. Major construction projects in the 1950s and 1960s extended the college, which soon included three dormitories, a library, and a number of classroom buildings.

The main campus of Buena Vista University offers a four-year residential collegiate experience and offers classes in 42 majors.  Seventeen additional locations throughout Iowa and online serve working adult and graduate students as part of the Graduate & Professional Studies program.

Academics

Schools

The various major study areas of Buena Vista University are grouped within four schools, each of which is administered by a dean.

 The Harold Walter Siebens School of Business
 The School of Education
 The School of Liberal Arts
 The School of Science

Pre-professional programs

Buena Vista University also offers pre-professional programs. Specific course requirements vary with each particular professional and school area and are worked out in detail with the faculty advisor.

William W. Siebens American Heritage Lecture

This lecture series addresses American freedoms. Speakers have included former U.S. Presidents George H.W. Bush and Jimmy Carter; former Prime Ministers Benazir Bhutto of Pakistan, Shimon Peres of Israel, F. W. de Klerk of South Africa, Margaret Thatcher and John Major of Britain; Madeleine Albright, Gen. Colin L. Powell, Walter Cronkite, Carl Sagan, Sir John Marks Templeton, Michael Gartner, Harry Blackmun, Bob Woodward, David Gergen, Jehan Sadat, Vicente Fox, and Paul Volcker.

ROTC program

In 2009, the military science program began at BVU, the only such program in Western Iowa. The mission of the program is derived directly from the regulations governing the Army Reserve Officers Training Corps (AROTC) which are issued by the Army Cadet Command and Army Training and Doctrine Command. Army ROTC is an elective curriculum students take along with their major program of study. The program is designed to give students tools, training and experiences that will help them succeed in any competitive environment.

Degree completion programs
Buena Vista University's degree completion programs offer educational opportunities across the state of Iowa at its off-campus locations. These sites are on the campuses of community colleges with which BVU has established partnerships. Locations include sites in Carroll, Council Bluffs, Creston, Denison, Fort Dodge, Emmetsburg, Estherville, Spencer, Spirit Lake, LeMars, Marshalltown, Mason City, Newton, Ottumwa, and West Burlington.

Campus buildings

Ballou Building
Formerly the main library facility, the Ballou Building houses the Offices of the President and Institutional Advancement, including the National Alumni Association. The lower level still houses the Allee Curriculum Library, containing 7,800 volumes; a student lounge and other library materials.

Dixon-Eilers Hall
Dixon-Eilers Hall houses BVU's business offices and the Office of the Registrar, in addition to housing classrooms. The building was completed in 1958 and stands on the site of the original "Old Main."

Edson Hall
Originally known as Victory Hall, the University gym before Siebens Fieldhouse was constructed in 1969, Edson Hall is now home to the BVU music department. Renovation of the hall was completed in early 1997 with the addition of a choral rehearsal room, nine state-of-the-art practice rooms, a piano/keyboard lab, a student work area, and additional office space.

Estelle Siebens Science Center
Completed in the summer of 2004, the  facility comfortably houses BVU's five interdisciplinary fields of science (biology, chemistry, computer science, mathematics, and physics), fostering collaboration among the disciplines, as well as between students and faculty.

The 18 laboratories complement seven classrooms, three research areas, and 24 offices. "Science Avenue," a prominent atrium corridor that puts projects on display, connects the two-story, glass-walled rotunda (nicknamed "The Beaker") to a greenhouse with three environmental growth chambers.

Finkbine Natatorium
Named in appreciation of Frank Finkbine in memory of his wife Mae Finkbine, Finkbine Natatorium is a six-lane  competition pool. This pool has been out of commission since 2020 and was turned into a court in 2021.

Harold Walter Siebens School of Business/Siebens Forum
The Harold Walter Siebens School of Business/Siebens Forum was completed in the spring of 1985. In addition to the Harold Walter Siebens School of Business and a conference center, it houses the Student and Career Services offices, food service and cafeteria, Anderson Auditorium (a 386-seat auditorium), Siebens Den, the Geisinger Student Leadership Center, the bookstore, post office, games area and snack bar, and other offices and lounges. Included in the Harold Walter Siebens School of Business are tiered seminar rooms, a case-study seminar room, faculty offices, and a special resource room that enables students to receive the latest market information from Wall Street and other sources. The conference center includes a board room, conference rooms, lobbies, and offices. The $10 million building, made possible by an $18 million gift from the late Dr. Harold Walter Siebens, also has telecommunication capabilities.

Library
The BVU Library is a facility with a capacity of 300,000 printed volumes, as well as one thousand journals and periodicals. Computerized periodical databases access many sources not available in the library. A coffee shop was added to the library in 2008. The Teaching and Learning with Technology Center, (TLTC) is in the library. The TLTC supports faculty in the integration of technology tools into teaching and learning.

Lage Communication Center
Lage Communication Center is the home of telecommunication at BVU. Lage houses the radio, television and print studios for the School of Communication and Arts. It is the control center for the telecommunication system, which extends throughout campus.

Lamberti Recreation Center
Construction was completed in 2001 on this  addition to the Siebens Fieldhouse. It features a six-lane indoor track, three courts for basketball, volleyball and tennis, an exercise and weight room, coaches offices, and locker/shower facilities. The $9.5 million project, funded entirely by donors, also included an  renovation of the Siebens Fieldhouse.

Lighthouse
A  brick lighthouse was built on the shores of Storm Lake near Siebens Fieldhouse in 1992 in memory of Buena Vista University trustee and benefactor Harold Walter Siebens. The lighthouse was a gift from the Siebens family.

McCorkle Hall
McCorkle Hall was completed in January 1996 and houses 72 students in six-person suites.

Peterson Field
Peterson Field is the site of football, soccer, and track activity. It is home to the J. Leslie Rollins Football Stadium. The  stadium extends between the  lines and has a seating capacity of approximately 2,500. Formerly known as Bradford Field, the field underwent massive renovation in 2011 with the addition of an artificial turf field and new all-weather track. Field lighting was added in 2012.

Schaller Memorial Chapel
Schaller Memorial Chapel, dedicated in 1963, adjoins Dixon-Eilers Hall. It serves as an auditorium and theater and is used for convocation services. Special events, such as Baccalaureate and Founders Day, are held here. A small meditation chapel is in the lower level. A special feature of the chapel is the Hansen Organ, a three-manual Reuter pipe organ with 2,048 pipes.

Siebens Fieldhouse
The main level of Siebens Fieldhouse houses a gymnasium, which seats 4,000 spectators. On this level are classrooms and coaches' offices. The balcony is used for aerobics, and a large double hitting area for softball and baseball. A shot put area is also available.

On the lower level are varsity locker rooms for men and women, laundry facilities, a wrestling room, a training room, handball and racquetball courts, and one of the most extensive weight lifting areas in the Iowa Conference. East of the Fieldhouse are four outdoor tennis courts for recreational and conference play.

Smith Hall
Built in 1925, Smith Hall was completely renovated in 1970. It houses classrooms and faculty offices.

Social Sciences and Art Hall
This building contains art facilities, classrooms and offices for social sciences, as well as an inviting gathering space with a fireplace and television. The building originally housed the science programs, and extensive remodeling was completed in 2008.

Steward D. Siebens Computer Center
The Stewart D. Siebens Computer Center offers hardware and software technical support via the Help Desk. The Help Desk also provides checkout services for digital still cameras, digital video cameras, extra batteries, laptop computers, and automobile A/C adapters. In the lab area, the Computer Center has a laser printer and several scanners.

Victory Arch
The Victory Arch was constructed from the remains of the Old Main archway. Old Main, constructed in 1893, was the principal building on campus until it was destroyed by fire in 1956. The Victory Arch is a symbol linking the past to the present. The Victory Arch stood on the southeast corner of Chapel lawn for many years before it was rebuilt atop the Harold Walter Siebens School of Business/Siebens Forum in 1984-85.

Student life

Residence life
The university has seven residence halls available for student living.

Swope Hall
The first residence hall built on campus, Swope Hall has single and double occupancy rooms. There are 10 housing communities, each with a resident advisor available for help. This building is no longer used to house students; instead, it is home to the nursing department for Iowa Central Community College and the theatre department for costume storage/design.

Pierce and White Halls 
It is a double complex, comprising two buildings. Both Pierce and White are co-ed halls with four floors and seven housing communities, each with a resident advisor available for help. The buildings share a common lobby and are connected underground with the Harold Walter Siebens School of Business/Siebens Forum, the main building on campus. Extensive remodeling of both buildings was completed in 2012.

Grand Hall 
Built in 1998, Grand Hall is a co-ed community with three floors. The building houses 100 students, including four resident advisors. Grand Hall was the first residence hall on campus to have an elevator.

Liberty Hall 
Finished in 2002, Liberty Hall is a voluntary substance-free building, built with similar design to Grand Hall. There is space, however for a faculty member to live in the building. Residents choosing to live in Liberty Hall sign a pledge form to not partake in drinking alcohol or smoking and chewing tobacco while on building premises.

Suites
The suites are apartment-style living quarters that group six residents in a suite in three bedrooms. There are three suite buildings:  Constitution, Briscoe (formerly Centennial Hall; named for former college president Keith Briscoe), and McCorkle (formerly Heritage Hall, named for Trustee Paul McCorkle).  Entrance in the suites is reserved for sophomores, juniors and seniors and is based on a point system made up of points assigned for the student's year and grade point average and seniority in the suites.

Athletics

Buena Vista University competes in 21 intercollegiate sports at the varsity level. The university is an NCAA Division III institution and a member of the American Rivers Conference (formerly the Iowa Intercollegiate Athletic Conference).  Teams that compete at BVU include baseball, men's and women's basketball, cross country, football, men's and women's golf, men's and women's soccer, men's and women's tennis, track & field, volleyball, and wrestling. Roughly one out of every four BVU students participate in intercollegiate athletics.

Buena Vista's mascot is the Beaver.  The origins of the Beaver as the Buena Vista mascot go back to the early 1900s, when the football team was called the BVers.  In the spring of 1921, a Buena Vista student combined that nickname with then-popular soft drink Bevo to create the nickname the Beavers.

Buena Vista's softball team appeared in one Women's College World Series in 1971.

Notable alumni
Nate Bjorkgren, former head coach of the Indiana Pacers
Jim Doran, football player for the Detroit Lions and Dallas Cowboys. 
Jim Fanning, MLB player with Chicago Cubs, first General Manager Montreal Expos
Ryan Grubb, Offensive coordinator at the University of Washington
Carlos Martinez, kicker for the Philadelphia Soul of the Arena Football League. 
Nelle Peters, architect
Randy Rahe, current head basketball coach at Weber State University
Jesse Schmidt, record setting wide receiver for the Iowa Barnstormers of the Arena Football League who was voted as the twenty-fifth greatest wide receiver in the league's history during the 2012 Arena Football League season.
Shelly M. Shelton, Republican member of the Nevada Assembly.
Andre D. Wagner, photographer
Lindsay Peoples Wagner, current editor-in-chief of the Cut.

References

External links

Official website
https://bvuathletics.com official  Athleticwebsite

 
Private universities and colleges in Iowa
Universities and colleges affiliated with the Presbyterian Church (USA)
Educational institutions established in 1891
Education in Buena Vista County, Iowa
Buildings and structures in Buena Vista County, Iowa
Tourist attractions in Buena Vista County, Iowa
1891 establishments in Iowa
Storm Lake, Iowa